Henri Fickinger (25 July 1930 – 3 April 1999) was a Luxembourgian footballer. He played in 16 matches for the Luxembourg national football team from 1949 to 1955. He was also part of Luxembourg's team for their qualification matches for the 1954 FIFA World Cup.

References

External links
 

1930 births
1999 deaths
Luxembourgian footballers
Luxembourg international footballers
Place of birth missing
Association football defenders
FC Progrès Niederkorn players